The Leader of the Opposition in Queensland is the title of the leader of the largest minority political party or coalition of parties, known as the Opposition, in the Parliament of Queensland. Prior to 1898, opposition to the government of the day was less organised. Thus the Queensland Parliamentary Record does not designate Leaders of the Opposition before then. The Leader is responsible for managing the Opposition and has a role in administering the Legislative Assembly through the Committee of the Legislative Assembly.

List of leaders of the opposition

Notes

1 On 2 April 2011, Campbell Newman was elected to lead the LNP into the 2012 Queensland state election, but was not recognised as the Leader of the Opposition as he was not a Member of Parliament during the 53rd Parliament.

References

External links
 Opposition Leaders from 1898. Queensland Parliamentary Record

Queensland
 
Opposition